David Mendes (15 May 1928 – 1 October 2021), who used the pseudonym Bob Mendes, was a Belgian accountant and writer of detective stories. He was born in Schoten, graduated in accountancy, fiscal duties and business administration and started his professional career as an accountant.

He made his literary debut in 1984, with the publication of a collection of poems Met rook geschreven (E: Written with smoke), followed by Alfa en Omega (Alpha and Omega).

Bibliography
 De kracht van het bloed
 Meester in misdaad
 Stukken van mensen
 Spannende Verhalen
 Medeschuldig
 De beste misdaadverhalen uit Vlaanderen
 Bloedrecht
 Dirty Dancing
 De smaak van vrijheid
 Verslag aan de Koning
 De kracht van het ijs
 Misdaad en meesterschap
 De kracht van het vuur
 Meedogenloos
 Link
 Rassen/Rellen
 Vergelding
 De fraudejagers
 De vierde soera
 Het chunnelsyndroom
 Twee Misdaadromans
 Een dag van schaamte
 Alfa en Omega
 Bestemming Terreur
 Met rook geschreven

See also
 Flemish literature

References

Sources
 Bob Mendes (Official website)
 Bob Mendes (in Dutch)
 Genootschap Van Vlaamse Misdaadauteurs (in Dutch)

20th-century Belgian Jews
21st-century Belgian Jews
1928 births
2021 deaths
Flemish writers
Belgian accountants
Belgian Sephardi Jews
Jewish writers
People from Schoten